The Dendermonde–Puurs Steam Railway (Stoomtrein Dendermonde-Puurs) is a heritage railway situated in the Belgian provinces of East Flanders (Oost-Vlaanderen) and Antwerp (Antwerpen).

The railway is maintained by SDP, a non-profit historical railway society. SDP, which stands for Stoomtrein Dendermonde Puurs, or Steam train Dendermonde Puurs , has a depot at the railway station in Baasrode-Noord. The trains are pulled by both steam and diesel locomotives.

The railway has been used occasionally by various film and television production companies to shoot movie scenes that are too elaborate to be filmed on the Belgian national railway network because of the potential disruption to traffic. The best known example of a movie that includes several scenes shot on the railway is Toto le Héros.

Motive Power

Steam locomotives

Diesel locomotives

Railcars

See also

Tubize 2069
Heritage railway
List of heritage railways

External links
Official site (in Dutch)
Official site (English version)

Railway lines in Belgium
Heritage railways in Belgium
Tourist attractions in East Flanders
Tourist attractions in Antwerp Province
Dendermonde
Puurs-Sint-Amands